Milecastle 24 (Wall Fell) was a milecastle of the Roman Hadrian's Wall.

Construction 
Because of the similarity in its construction to that of Milecastle 23, Milecastle 24 is assumed to be a long-axis milecastle.  The gateway type is unknown, though long-axis milecastles were thought to have been constructed by the Legio VI Victrix who were based in Eboracum (York).

A change in the vegetation in the ditch adjacent to the south gateway may suggest the prior existence of a causeway that was subsequently removed.

Excavations and investigations

1879 – The milecastle was visited and depicted by James Irwin Coates.

1930 – The location and construction details of the milecastle were established.
1966 – English Heritage Field Investigation. The position of the milecastle was confirmed.

1989 – English Heritage Field Investigation. The milecastle position and probable axis type were also confirmed.

Associated turrets 
Each milecastle on Hadrian's Wall had two associated turret structures.  These turrets were positioned approximately one-third and two-thirds of a Roman mile to the west of the Milecastle, and would probably have been manned by part of the milecastle's garrison.  The turrets associated with Milecastle 24 are known as Turret 24A and Turret 24B.

Turret 24A
Turret 24A (Green Field) is now located beneath the B6318 Military Road, though it was excavated in February 1930.  Remains of its masonry were three courses high on the north west corner, gradually reducing to one at the other corner.

Location on Ordnance Survey 1:25 000 map:

Turret 24B
Turret 24B (Tithe Barn) is now located beneath the B6318 Military Road, though it was excavated in February 1930.  Remains of its masonry, like those of Turret 23A, were three courses high on the north west corner, gradually reducing to one at the other corner.

Location on Ordnance Survey 1:25 000 map:

Monument records

Public access
Access to the mound marking the Milecastle is via the Hadrian's Wall Path National Trail.

References

Bibliography

External links 

24
Wall, Northumberland